Francisco 'Francis' Roig Genís (born 1 April 1968) is a retired professional tennis player from Spain. He is primarily a doubles player, winning 9 ATP World Tour titles and reaching 12 more finals. He acted as the alternate coach of fellow Spaniard Rafael Nadal from 2005 until 2022.

ATP Tour finals

Doubles (9 titles)

Finalist (12)
1992: Guaruja (with Diego Pérez, lost to Christer Allgårdh and Carl Limberger).
1993: Umag (with Jordi Arrese, lost to Filip Dewulf and Tom Vanhoudt).
1994: Santiago (with Tomás Carbonell, lost to Karel Nováček and Mats Wilander).
1994: Buenos Aires (with Tomás Carbonell, lost to Sergio Casal and Emilio Sánchez).
1995: Dubai (with Tomás Carbonell, lost to Grant Connell and Patrick Galbraith).
1995: Rotterdam (with Tomás Carbonell, lost to Martin Damm and Anders Järryd).
1996: Casablanca (with Tomás Carbonell, lost to Jiří Novák and David Rikl).
1996: Stuttgart Outdoor (with Tomás Carbonell, lost to Libor Pimek and Byron Talbot).
1998: Antwerp (with Tomás Carbonell, lost to Wayne Ferreira and Yevgeny Kafelnikov).
1998: Lyon (with Tomás Carbonell, lost to Olivier Delaître and Fabrice Santoro).
1999: Majorca (with Alberto Berasategui, lost to Lucas Arnold and Tomás Carbonell).
2001: Majorca (with Feliciano López, lost to Donald Johnson and Jared Palmer).

Top 10 wins 
 Roig has a 1–7 (.125) record against players who were, at the time the match was played, ranked in the top 10.

References

External links
 
 
 

1968 births
Living people
Tennis players from Catalonia
Spanish male tennis players
Tennis players from Barcelona